Kistenmacher is a surname. Notable people with the surname include:

 Catherine B. Kistenmacher (1927–2008), American artist and art advocate
 Enrique Kistenmacher (1923–1990), Argentine decathlete